William Kopecky (born November 17, 1969) is an American musician from Racine, Wisconsin, United States. He currently resides in France and, in 2011, work with Haiku Funeral featured his spoken-word delivery of dark poetry. He is known for playing bass, keyboards and sitar in the band Kopecky with his two brothers, Joe and Paul. He also contributed to numerous progressive rock acts, including Far Corner, Parallel Mind, Pär Lindh Project. Kopecky has put forward that the dark, moody at times oppressive atmosphere of the Yeti Rain project is influenced by storms. The heavy prog rock of Kopecky's Snarling Adjective Convention projects features group improvisation. In a 10-April 2011 interview, Kopecky stated that a new Far Corner album is underway, but may not come out on Cuneiform due to the label's already set release schedule.

Influences
Kopecky lists his influences as the following:

Chris Squire
Billy Sheehan
Mick Karn
Jaco Pastorius
Yngwie Malmsteen
Ravi Shankar
Tripti Mukherjee
Veena Chandra
Ritual music of Tibetan monks
Robert Smith
Univers Zero
Rush
Miles Davis
Robert Fripp
Edgar Allan Poe
J. G. Ballard
Georges Bataille
The Surrealists
Ben Okri
Hans Bellmer
H. R. Giger
Francis Bacon
David Lynch
Andrei Tarkovsky
The Brothers Quay

Equipment

Bass guitars
Axtra 4-string fretted and fretless custom basses
5-string Music Man Bongo
6-string Warwick Corvette
Roland V-Bass.

Amplifiers
Hartke 3500
Ampeg SVT II Pro

Cabinets
Ampeg 8x10
Ampeg 4x10

Effects
Boss effects pedals (flanger, phaser, chorus and digital delay)
Red Llama distortion

Other equipment
Boomerang loop device
EBows

Selected discography

with Kopecky
Kopecky (1999)
Serpentine Kaleidoscope (2000)
Orion (2001)
Sunset Gun (2003)
Blood (2006)

with Michael Angelo Batio
Lucid Intervals and Moments of Clarity (2000)
Lucid Intervals and Moments of Clarity Part 2 (2004)
Hands Without Shadows (2005)

with C4
Call to Arms (2001)

with Haiku Funeral 
Funeral Assassination in the Hashish Cathedral (2009)
If God is a Drug (2010)

with Par Lindh Project
Live in Iceland (2002)
Live in Poland (2008)

with The Flyin' Ryan Brothers
Legacy (2002)
Blue Marble (2005)
Totality (2008)

with The Bollenberg Experience
If Only Stones Could Speak (2002)

with Truth Squad
Superkiller (2003)

with Far Corner
Far Corner (2004)
Endangered (2007)
Intermission (2009)

with Parallel Mind
Colossus ADEA (2005)

with Silence the Freak
Relations (2005)

with Yeti Rain
Discarnate (2006)
Nest of Storms (2008)
III (2010)
Stars Fall Darkly (2013)

with Dan Maske
Progressive Rock Keyboard (2007)

with Dimension X
Implications of a Genetic Defense (2007)

with Anja
Leaving the Alley of Dead Trees (2007)

with Glass
Live at Progman Cometh (2007)

with Snarling Adjective Convention
Bluewolf Bloodwalk (2008)

References

External links
Official website
Kopecky official website
Yeti Rain official Myspace
Haiku Funeral official Myspace
Kopecky official Myspace
Hikikomori Records

1969 births
Living people
American rock bass guitarists
American rock keyboardists
American heavy metal musicians
People from Racine, Wisconsin